The Tropic of Capricorn is the more southerly circle of latitude of the Earth's tropics region.

Tropic of Capricorn may also refer to:

Tropic of Capricorn (novel), Henry Miller novel
Tropic of Capricorn (TV series), BBC TV series
 Tropic of Capricorn (album)